Pediocactus bradyi is a very rare species of cactus known by the common names Brady's pincushion cactus, Brady's hedgehog cactus, and Marble Canyon cactus. It is endemic to Arizona in the USA, where it is restricted to Marble Canyon in Coconino County, though its exact distribution is not generally advertised due to poaching concerns. It is limited to a specific type of soil, it has a small distribution, and the species is threatened by a number of human activities. This has been a federally listed endangered species of the United States since 1979.

Description
This cactus is globose, tubercular, and usually solitary. It is up to about 6 centimeters tall by 5 wide. Each areole has some wool and several slightly curved yellowish to white spines up to half a centimeter long. There are occasionally one or two central spines which are darker in color. The cactus flowers in the early spring. The flower is up to roughly 2 centimeters long by 3 wide and has red or green-striped yellowish outer tepals and straw-colored inner tepals. The fruit is green ripening red-brown and about a centimeter long. The cactus shrinks and retracts under the ground during the dry season, making it very hard to find. The related cacti Pediocactus winkleri and Pediocactus despainii are sometimes included as subspecies of P. bradyi.

Subspecies

Distribution and habitat
The cactus grows on sandstone and shale land originating from the Moenkopi Formation, a geologic formation. This rock is covered in chips and gravel of Kaibab limestone, forming the plant's substrate. It is not found in any other soil types. It grows alongside plants such as shadscale (Atriplex confertifolia), snakeweed (Gutierrezia sarothrae), and Mormon tea (Ephedra viridis).

This plant was listed as an endangered species because of many threats, including highway construction and maintenance, off-road vehicle use, cattle grazing, and poaching. Natural threats to the species include frost heaving. The small population size limited in distribution makes it vulnerable to extinction. It is also vulnerable to the effects of climate change, especially increased droughts.

References

External links
USDA Plants Profile for Pediocactus bradyi
UC Photos gallery − Pediocactus bradyi

Cacti of the United States
Flora of Arizona
Endemic flora of the United States
Natural history of Coconino County, Arizona
Natural history of the Grand Canyon
Critically endangered flora of the United States
bradyi